The 1999–2000 Bundesliga was the 37th season of the Bundesliga, Germany's premier football league. It began on 13 August 1999 and ended on 20 May 2000. FC Bayern Munich were the defending champions.

Competition modus
Every team played two games against each other team, one at home and one away. Teams received three points for a win and one point for a draw. If two or more teams were tied on points, places were determined by goal difference and, if still tied, by goals scored. The team with the most points were crowned champions while the three teams with the fewest points were relegated to 2. Bundesliga.

Team changes to 1998–99
1. FC Nürnberg, VfL Bochum and Borussia Mönchengladbach were relegated to the 2. Bundesliga after finishing in the last three places. They were replaced by Arminia Bielefeld, SpVgg Unterhaching and SSV Ulm.

Season overview

Five matches before the end of the league, Bayer Leverkusen had 61 points and defending champions Bayern Munich was in 60. At the 30th fixture, Bayer 04 got 3 points ahead, and continued winning until the 33rd round. Before the final fixture start, Bayer had 73 points, with Bayern having 70. However, Leverkusen lost away to Unterhaching 2–0, and Bayern celebrated the championship winning against Werder Bremen 3–1 at home, due to their superior goal difference over Bayer 04.

Team overview

(*) Promoted from 2. Bundesliga.

League table

Results

Top goalscorers

Champion squad

References

External links
 DFB Bundesliga archive 1999/2000

Bundesliga seasons
1
Germany